Michael O'Brien, DD (b Ardconnell 31 March 1876; d Killarney 4 October 1952) was an Irish Roman Catholic Bishop in  the mid 20th century.

O'Brien was educated at St Patrick's College, Maynooth and ordained in 1901. He was Bishop of Ardfert and Aghadoe from 1927 until his death.

References

1876 births
1952 deaths
20th-century Roman Catholic bishops in Ireland
Roman Catholic Bishops of Ardfert and Agahdoe
Alumni of St Patrick's College, Maynooth
Clergy from County Kerry